The boys singles tennis event at the 2019 European Youth Summer Olympic Festival was held at the Baku Tennis Academy, Baku, Azerbaijan from 21 to 27 July 2019.

Schedule
All times are Azerbaijan Time (UTC+04:00)

Finals

Top half

Section 1

Section 2

Bottom half

Section 3

Section 4

References

External links
 

Boys' singles